Jana Freeburn (born Jana Babková) is a Czechoslovak-born American slalom canoeist who competed from the mid-1980s to the mid-1990s. She won a silver medal in the K-1 team event at the 1993 ICF Canoe Slalom World Championships in Mezzana.

References
Overview of athlete's results at canoeslalom.net 

American female canoeists
Living people
Year of birth missing (living people)
Medalists at the ICF Canoe Slalom World Championships
21st-century American women